"Love Makes Things Happen" is a song by American recording artist Pebbles featuring guest vocals by Babyface. Taken from Pebbles' second album Always (1990), the song spent two weeks at number one on the US Billboard Hot R&B Singles chart, and peaked at number 13 on the Billboard Hot 100.

Music video
Pebbles and Babyface sing the lyrics as a series of situations are shown. The video starts with a man kissing his wife goodbye as heads to work. Then various situations show various people meeting by chance and fall for each other. In the end a man is shown meeting his wife showing that from the beginning they were meant to be. The video ends with shot of the man arriving home to his wife and kids.

Chart performance

See also
List of number-one R&B singles of 1991 (U.S.)

References

1990 singles
Babyface (musician) songs
Perri "Pebbles" Reid songs
Male–female vocal duets
Song recordings produced by Babyface (musician)
1990 songs
Songs written by Babyface (musician)
Songs written by L.A. Reid
Song recordings produced by L.A. Reid
MCA Records singles
1990s ballads